Ron Dixon may refer to:

 Ron Dixon (Brookside), a character in the British soap opera Brookside
 Ron Dixon (American football) (born 1976), American football wide receiver 
 Ron Dixon (Australian footballer) (born 1933), Australian rules footballer